The Cryan' Shames are an American garage rock band from Hinsdale, Illinois. Originally known as The Travelers, the band was formed by Tom Doody ("Toad"), Gerry Stone ("Stonehenge"), Dave Purple ("Grape") of The Prowlers, Denny Conroy from Possum River, and Jim Fairs from The Roosters, Jim Pilster ("J.C. Hooke", so named because he was born without a left hand and wore a hook), and Bill Hughes. The band's most successful song was their cover of The Searchers' "Sugar and Spice".

History
In 1966, upon learning that another band was already using the name “Tommy and the Travelers”, they needed to find another name. J.C. Hooke was familiar with the Tommy of that band, and JC asked Tommy if he would be interested in joining their band instead; when Tommy Krein (Last name pronounced Cryan) declined, JC remarked that it was "a cryan' shame," thus naming the band. After the Cryan' Shames signed with Bob Monaco, the promotion manager for Destination Music, their first single was supposed to be George Harrison's song "If I Needed Someone"; however, due to publication issues, it was not released (although it was included on their debut album). Instead, their first single was "Sugar and Spice," a Tony Hatch song that had been a 1963 hit for the English group The Searchers. The Shames' version reached number 49 in the US and number four on Chicago radio (WLS). Another single was released just before the end of 1966 called "I Wanna Meet You" b/w "We Could Be Happy", both composed by Jim Fairs. This record made it to number one in Chicago and number 85 nationally.

The Shames signed to Columbia in 1966, and they focused on their first album release, which was heavily influenced by The Byrds. Their album, Sugar and Spice, was recorded in just two days, but it was strengthened by cover versions of contemporary popular songs like "We Gotta Get Out of This Place" and "Hey Joe". Upon its October 1966 release, the album became a hit in Chicago and charted at number 192 nationally. Dave Purple and Gerry Stone left following the first album release. They were replaced by Isaac Guillory and Lenny Kerley.

Follow-up singles met with lesser success, but, in August 1967, "It Could Be We're in Love" was #1 in Chicago on both WLS and WCFL. Before the development of their second album, Stone was drafted to fight in the Vietnam War and lineup changes followed. Their second album, an experimental combination of psychedelic rock and studio arrangements, charted at number 156. Their productions and vocal harmonies had improved, which was reflected positively in album sales.  Jim Fairs and Dennis Conroy left following the release of the second album.  They were replaced by Dave Carter and Alan Dawson.

The group's new lineup released their final album, Synthesis. The album marked attempts at progressive rock with jazz influences. The album charted lower than their previous effort and was considered a disappointment. The group disbanded in December 1969, but they later reunited and continue to tour. The Shames were never a national success, but their singles and albums sold well in the Chicago area. Jim "J.C. Hooke" Pilster and Tom Doody (Toad) are the only remaining original members in the current lineup. Two members of The Cryan' Shames have died: bassist Dave Purple in June 2001, and his replacement, Isaac Guillory, on December 31, 2000.

Discography

Singles

Albums

References

External links
 
 

Musical groups established in 1966
Garage rock groups from Illinois
1966 establishments in Illinois